Sudesh Berry  is an Indian actor and personality known for his works in Hindi cinema and Indian television.

Films
 Rajnandini (2021)
Sardar Saab (2017) (Punjabi)
 Sanam Teri Kasam (2016) - Inder's father
 Ainthu Ainthu Ainthu (2013) - Chitranjan (Tamil)
 Boss - Dushayat(Special Appearance)
 Mumbai Mirror - (Special Appearance)
 Second Show (Malayalam) (2012)-Vishnu Budhan
 Mumba (2010)
 Admissions Open (2010) - Doctor
 99 (2009) - Sunil Mehta
 Wafaa (2008) - Inspector Harry
 Kaafila (2007) - Santokh Singh
 Tango Charlie (2005) - BSF soldier Bhiku
 Wajahh: A Reason to Kill (2004) - Sameer
 Border Hindustaan Ka (2003) - Jaffar/Jaanisar (Double role)
 Aaj Ka Andha Kanoon (2003) - Inspector Yash
 LOC: Kargil (2003) - COL. Lalit Rai (CO, 1/11 Gurkha Rifles)
 Aakhri Inteqam (2002) - Devendra Prasad Srivastav (Deva)
 Inth Ka Jawab Patthar (2002) - Inspector Vijay Saxena
 Maa Tujhhe Salaam (2002) - Gul Mastan
 Avgat (2001)
 Khatron ke Khiladi (2000)
 Refugee (2000) - Gul Hamid
 Woh Bewafa Thi (2000)
 Border (1997) - Subedar Mathura Das
 Army (1996) - Khan
 Himmat (1996) - Abdul (Special Appearance)
 Mohini (1995)
 Policewala Gunda (1995) - ACP Ajit singh brother
 Veergati (1995) - Inspector Neelkanth
 Fauj (1994)
 Kayda Kanoon (1993) - Kishan
 Pehla Nasha (1993) - Himself (guest appearance)
 Vansh (1992) - Gautam
 Yudhpath (1992)
 Ghayal (1990) as Rajan Berry
 Khatron Ke Khiladi (1988) (Uncredited)

Television

References

External links
 

Living people
Indian male film actors
Male actors in Malayalam cinema
Male actors in Hindi cinema
Male actors from Mumbai
20th-century Indian male actors
21st-century Indian male actors
Indian male television actors
Male actors in Hindi television
1960 births